Michał Gliwa (born 8 April 1988) is a Polish professional footballer who plays as a goalkeeper for I liga side Zagłębie Sosnowiec.

Club career
On 3 August 2020, he joined Stal Mielec.

Honours

Dyskobolia Grodzisk Wielkopolski
Ekstraklasa Cup: 2007–08

References

External links
 
 

1988 births
Living people
People from Rzeszów
Polish footballers
Poland international footballers
Poland under-21 international footballers
Polish expatriate footballers
Association football goalkeepers
Polonia Warsaw players
Zagłębie Lubin players
CS Pandurii Târgu Jiu players
Sandecja Nowy Sącz players
Stal Mielec players
Zagłębie Sosnowiec players
Ekstraklasa players
I liga players
Liga I players
Expatriate footballers in Romania
Polish expatriate sportspeople in Romania
Sportspeople from Podkarpackie Voivodeship